"Si me quieres escribir" (English: "If You Want to Write to Me"), also known as "Ya sabes mi paradero" ("You Know Where I Am Posted") and "El frente de Gandesa" (The Gandesa Front), is one of the most famous songs of the Spanish Republican troops during the Spanish Civil War.

Background
The melody is based on a former song of the Spanish military units in the Rif Wars in Northern Morocco in the 1920s. The lyrics may change according to the location of the combat and the units involved. The Gandesa front and the blowing up of pontoons and bridges are related to the passage of the river in the Battle of the Ebro, also mentioned in ¡Ay Carmela!. The Spanish Republican combat engineers were capable of repeatedly repairing the bridges and pontoons in order to allow the loyalist troops to cross the river —at least a few hours every day— despite the steady bombings of the Nazi Condor Legion and the Italian Aviazione Legionaria, as well as the intentional flooding by releasing water from dams upstream.

The moros (Moors) mentioned in some verses are the Regulares, the feared Moroccan shock troop units of the Nationalist faction that kept pounding Republican positions for months at the Gandesa frontline.

Lyrics

The main stanza begins mostly with Si me quieres escribir; it is usually repeated at the end. Also every pair of verses is repeated twice. There are many different stanzas and these may be subject to local variations and be sung in different combinations. The following are some of the most common:

Variants
One popular Civil War variant of this song where the lyrics make reference to the Siege of Madrid is known as "Los Emboscados". These are two of the main stanzas:

The first stanza of "Los emboscados" is an adaptation of an older variant of 1936 that was not related to the war:

See also
Songs of the Spanish Civil War
Canciones de la Guerra Civil Española
The Ballad of the Fallen
To All We Stretch the Open Arm

References

External links 
Si Me Quieres Escribir - Quetzal
Si me quieres escribir - Tercera Brigada Mixta
Letra si me quieres escribir - Skalariak
Si me quieres escribir live - Marina Rosell

Songs of the Spanish Civil War
Spanish-language songs
Anti-fascist music
Second Spanish Republic
Spanish anthems
1930s songs